Severance is a Statutory Town in Weld County, Colorado, United States. The population was 7,683 at the 2020 census. The town is located on the Colorado Eastern Plains, northwest of Greeley, a crossroads of county roads.

A post office in Severance has been in operation since 1894.  The community was named after David Severance, a pioneer settler.

Rocky Mountain oysters, a regional dish, is served at Bruce's Bar, a local landmark.

Severance is also the home of KRKA radio, an Air 1 station with a far-reaching signal which can be heard as far away as Denver.

Geography

Demographics

As of the census of 2000, there were 597 people, 201 households, and 162 families residing in the town. The racial makeup of the town was 91.46% White, 0.34% African American, 0.67% Native American, 0.34% Asian, 5.19% from other races, and 2.01% from two or more races. Hispanic or Latino of any race were 11.39% of the population.

There were 201 households, out of which 52.2% had children under the age of 18 living with them, 69.7% were married couples living together, 8.5% had a female householder with no husband present, and 19.4% were non-families. 12.9% of all households were made up of individuals, and 1.5% had someone living alone who was 65 years of age or older.  The average household size was 2.97 and the average family size was 3.31.

In the town, the population was spread out, with 35.0% under the age of 18, 5.5% from 18 to 24, 41.4% from 25 to 44, 14.7% from 45 to 64, and 3.4% who were 65 years of age or older.  The median age was 30 years. For every 100 females, there were 105.9 males.  For every 100 females age 18 and over, there were 100.0 males.

The median income for a household in the town was $50,625, and the median income for a family was $55,781. Males had a median income of $40,375 versus $26,645 for females. The per capita income for the town was $17,625.  About 2.8% of families and 7.5% of the population were below the poverty line, including 7.7% of those under age 18 and none of those age 65 or over.

Governance
The town previously had a ban on snowball fights that was repealed in 2018 after 9-year old advocated for the repeal.

Population Growth

Since 1990 Severance has seen exponential population growth.  In 1990 there was just over 100 people.  Today, the town is estimated to contain over 9,000 people.

See also

Outline of Colorado
Index of Colorado-related articles
State of Colorado
Colorado cities and towns
Colorado municipalities
Colorado counties
Weld County, Colorado
Colorado metropolitan areas
Front Range Urban Corridor
North Central Colorado Urban Area
Denver-Aurora-Boulder, CO Combined Statistical Area
Greeley, CO Metropolitan Statistical Area

References

External links
 Town of Severance website
 CDOT map of the Town of Severance
 Windsor Beacon oldest newspaper in Severance

Towns in Weld County, Colorado
Towns in Colorado